The 2017 Soul Train Music Awards took place on November 5, 2017 at the Orleans Arena in Las Vegas, Nevada, and aired  on BET Her and BET on November 26, 2017. American singer and songwriter Toni Braxton was honored with the Legend Award for her contributions to the music industry, while the R&B girl group SWV received the Lady of Soul Award.

Special awards

Legend Award
 Toni Braxton

Lady of Soul Award
 SWV

Winners and Nominees
Winners are listed first and highlighted in bold.

Best New Artist
 6LACK
 H.E.R.
 Kevin Ross
 Khalid
 SZA

Best R&B/Soul Male Artist
 Bruno Mars
 Bryson Tiller
 Chris Brown
 Khalid
 The Weeknd

Best R&B/Soul Female Artist
 Kehlani
 Lalah Hathaway
 Ledisi
 Mary J. Blige
 Solange
 SZA

Soul Train Certified Award
 Bell Biv Devoe
 Johnny Gill
 Lalah Hathaway
 Ledisi
 Mack Wilds

Video of the Year
 Beyoncé – "All Night"
 Bruno Mars – "24K Magic"
 Chris Brown featuring Usher and Gucci Mane – "Party"
 DJ Khaled featuring Rihanna and Bryson Tiller – "Wild Thoughts"
 Solange – "Cranes in the Sky"

Best Gospel/Inspirational Award
 Chance the Rapper
 Charlie Wilson
 Kirk Franklin
 Lecrae
 Tamela Mann

Album/Mixtape of the Year
 Bruno Mars – 24K Magic
 Mary J. Blige – Strength of a Woman
 Solange – A Seat at the Table
 SZA – Ctrl
 The Weeknd – Starboy

Rhythm & Bars Award
 Cardi B – "Bodak Yellow"
 DJ Khaled featuring Rihanna and Bryson Tiller – "Wild Thoughts"
 French Montana featuring Swae Lee – "Unforgettable"
 Kendrick Lamar – "Humble."
 Yo Gotti featuring Nicki Minaj – "Rake It Up"

Song Of The Year
 Bruno Mars – "That's What I Like"
 Childish Gambino – "Redbone"
 DJ Khaled featuring Rihanna and Bryson Tiller – "Wild Thoughts"
 Khalid – "Location"
 Solange – "Cranes in the Sky"

The Ashford & Simpson Songwriter's Award
 "Cranes in the Sky"
 Written By: Troy L. John, Solange Knowles, Raphael Saadiq (Solange)
 "Location"
 Written By: Alfredo Emmanuel Gonzalez, Olatunji Olutomiwa, Samuel David Jimenez, Khalid Robinson, Joshua Scruggs (Khalid)
 "Love Me Now" 
 Written By: Blake Matthew Simon Mills, John Henry Ryan, John Roger Stephens (John Legend)
 "Redbone"
 Written By: George Clinton, William Earl Collins, Gary Lee Cooer, Donald McKinley Glover II, Ludwig Emil Tomas Göransson (Childish Gambino)
 "Versace on the Floor"
 Written By: Christopher Steven Brown, James Edward Fauntleroy, Bruno Mars, Philip Martin Lawrence (Bruno Mars)

Best Dance Performance
 Bruno Mars – "24K Magic"
 Chris Brown featuring Usher and Gucci Mane – "Party"
 DJ Khaled featuring Rihanna and Bryson Tiller – "Wild Thoughts"
 Solange featuring Sampha – "Don't Touch My Hair"
 Wizkid featuring Drake – "Come Closer"

Best Collaboration
 DJ Khaled featuring Rihanna and Bryson Tiller – "Wild Thoughts"
 Jazmine Sullivan and Bryson Tiller – "Insecure"
 Mary J. Blige featuring Kanye West – "Love Yourself"
 Solange featuring Sampha – "Don't Touch My Hair"
 SZA featuring Travis Scott – "Love Galore"

References

Soul
Soul Train Music Awards
2017 awards in the United States
Soul
Soul
Soul Train Music Awards 2017